Jules Maes Saloon is by some accounts the oldest bar in Seattle, in the U.S. state of Washington. It opened in 1888 in the city's Georgetown neighborhood. The building it occupies, "The Brick Store", at 5919 Airport Way at the corner of Nebraska, is listed as a Seattle Historic Site.

History 
The bar first opened in a building at 5953 Airport Way South (before it was called Airport Way, for nearby Boeing Field) under a different name. It was purchased by Jules Gustaf Maes, a Belgian-born bartender, who eventually changed its name and moved it to the 5919 building. The back room was once used as a bookie joint. 

The bar was owned by June Espelend for a period. John and Vanessa LeMaster, who had owned it since 2005, closed it during the coronavirus pandemic. During the coronavirus pandemic the LeMasters closed it permanently; it was reopened by Raché Hemmelgarn in January of 2021.

References

External links
 

1888 establishments in the United States
Drinking establishments in Washington (state)
Georgetown, Seattle
Restaurants disestablished during the COVID-19 pandemic
Restaurants in Seattle